The following is an incomplete list of association football clubs based in Mauritius.
For a complete list see :Category:Football clubs in Mauritius

A
 Arsenal Wanderers
 AS de Vacoas-Phoenix
 AS Port-Louis 2000
 AS Rivière du Rempart
 AS Quatre Bornes

B
 Bambous Etoile de L'ouest SC
 Bolton City Youth Club
 Bambous Western Cadets National Youth Club
Bon Air SC

C
 Cercle de Joachim SC
 Chamarel FC
 Curepipe Starlight SC
 Hindu Cadet Club

E
 Entente Boulet Rouge SC

F
 Faucon Flacq SC
 Fire Brigade SC

G

M
Morcellement St Andre Young Lions SC
MSA Shining SC

P
 Pamplemousses SC
 Petite Rivière Noire FC
 Pointe-aux-Sables Mates

S
 Savanne SC

U
 Union Sportive de Beau-Bassin Rose-Hill

 
Mauritius
Clubs
Football clubs